The 1991–92 Houston Cougars men's basketball team represented the University of Houston as a member of the Southwest Conference during the 1991–92 NCAA men's basketball season. The head coach was Pat Foster, and the team played its home games at the Hofheinz Pavilion in Houston, Texas.

The Cougars tied for the regular season SWC title and won the SWC tournament to earn an automatic bid to the NCAA tournament. Houston lost in the opening round to Georgia Tech, 65–60, to finish with a record of 25–6 (11–3 SWC).

Roster

Schedule and results

|-
!colspan=12 style=| Regular season

|-
!colspan=12 style=| SWC Tournament

|-
!colspan=12 style=| NCAA Tournament

References

Houston Cougars men's basketball seasons
Houston
Houston
Houston
Houston